Arvida is a settlement of 12,000 people (2010) in Quebec, Canada, that is part of the City of Saguenay. Its name is derived from the name of its founder, Arthur Vining Davis, president of the Alcoa aluminum company.

Arvida was founded as an industrial city by Alcoa in 1927, when the first aluminum smelter was constructed. It was known as "the City Built in 135 Days" and described by The New York Times as a "model town for working families" on "a North Canada steppe".

History

In 1912 James B. Duke purchased the rights to the power on the Saguenay River, and in 1925 the Isle Maligne power station near Lac St. Jean came on stream (then the world's largest). In 1926 more than 250 houses were completed and the first ingots were poured. In 1932 Chute-à-Caron power station near Kénogami came on stream. The Shipshaw power station, just below Chute-à-Caron, came on stream during World War II and the Saguenay Inn in Arvida was completed. In 1950 the Arvida Bridge, an arched aluminum bridge, was completed, spanning the old Saguenay gorge near the Shipshaw power house. 

During World War II, the smelter was expanded and a large hydroelectric complex was built on the Saguenay River at Shipshaw (1 200 000 HP), becoming the largest aluminum production centre in the Western world.  Because of its importance to the Allied war effort, the town was guarded by anti-aircraft batteries. The smelter transforms imported bauxite to alumina, and then to aluminum, by electrolysis. This process, and the smelting plant thereto, employed up to 7,500 people in the 1950s and the 1960s. The plant was due to close in 2005, as it had been replaced by at least three plants constructed during the last ten years in the Saguenay area. Rio Tinto Alcan continues to operate a smelter and related plants in the Arvida area.

In the early 1970s, survivors of the 1971 landslide at nearby Saint-Jean-Vianney were largely resettled to Arvida.

In 1975, the cities of Arvida, Kénogami and Jonquière were amalgamated into a new city, Jonquière. In 2002, this amalgamated Jonquière was merged with Lac-Kénogami, Shipshaw, Chicoutimi, Laterrière, La Baie and Tremblay township into the city of Saguenay.

In 2010, local Councillor Carl Dufour and others sought recognition from Parks Canada as a heritage site, the first step in applying for recognition as a World Heritage Site by UNESCO.

Climate

Notable people

Artist Claire Beaulieu was born in Arvida.

Professional heavyweight champion wrestler Stan Stasiak was born in Arvida.

References

Further reading
Campbell is a good history of the development of aluminum smelting in the Saguenay. Hartwick's more recent book reports on work between 1950 and 68 at Labs in Arvida to develop a new industrial smelting process, the so-called monochloride process.

 Duncan C. Campbell, Global Mission: The Story of Alcan. Volume 1: to 1950.   Ontario Publishing Company Limited, 1985.
 John M. Hartwick, Out of Arvida. Kingston, Ontario: Citoxique Press, 2007.

In 2011, writer Samuel Archibald, raised in Arvida, published a collection of short stories, Arvida, that won several Francophone literary prizes. In 2015, the collection was translated into English by Donald Winkler (Biblioasis Books) and was short-listed for the 2015 Scotiabank Giller Prize.

External links
 "Giant of the North" Popular Mechanics, December 1943, article on the crash program to create the Shipshaw hydroelectric project

Neighbourhoods in Saguenay, Quebec
Company towns in Canada
Former municipalities in Quebec
Former cities in Quebec
National Historic Sites in Quebec
Populated places disestablished in 1975